Natalie Jane Anderson (born on 24 October 1981) is an English actress, singer and television presenter. She is known for her roles as Stella Davenport in the medical drama The Royal from 2005 to 2008 and Alicia Metcalfe in the ITV soap opera Emmerdale from 2010 to 2015. She also played the role of Nessarose in the London production Wicked from May 2009 to March 2010. In 2015, she began appearing on the ITV talk shows This Morning and Loose Women on a recurring basis; Anderson also portrayed the role of Lexi Calder in the Channel 4 soap opera Hollyoaks from 2021 to 2022.

Early and personal life
Anderson was born in Bradford, West Yorkshire, England. She was once a Bradford Bulls chearleader. Anderson married fiancé James Shepherd at a ceremony in Harrogate on 6 June 2008. On 1 August 2012, Anderson and her husband had their first son.

Career
In 2001, Anderson competed in Pop Idol; she narrowly missed out on a place in the live finals after finishing third in her group. Anderson appeared as Nurse Stella Davenport in the ITV drama series The Royal between 2005 and 2008. Then in 2008, she released an album, Return to Me. Anderson joined the cast of Emmerdale in 2010 as Alicia Gallagher, Leyla Harding's (Roxy Shahidi) sister. On 24 May 2015, Anderson announced she would be not be renewing her contract for Emmerdale and would leave the soap after five years.

On 9 February 2014, Anderson appeared on the ITV entertainment show,  All Star Family Fortunes with her family, who were competing against Steve Redgrave and his family. On 27 September 2014, Anderson appeared in a celebrity episode of The Chase. In 2015, she began appearing on the ITV talk shows Loose Women and This Morning as an occasional presenter. In 2016, she launched the lifestyle brand, the Capsule; the brand focuses on fashion, beauty and wellbeing, and in 2019, its accompanying podcast The Capsule in Conversation interviewing celebrities and experts was launched. From 2018 to 2019, Anderson hosted Mishaps Podcast with Jodie Prenger and Neil Hurst. In October 2021, she began appearing in the Channel 4 soap opera Hollyoaks as Lexi Calder. Natalie played Maryanne Borden in the Liam Neeson action feature Memory, released 29 April 2022.

Filmography

Awards and nominations

References

External links
 

English television actresses
Living people
Actresses from Bradford
English stage actresses
21st-century English actresses
English soap opera actresses
English women pop singers
20th-century English actresses
Pop Idol contestants
Your Face Sounds Familiar winners
21st-century English women singers
21st-century English singers
1981 births